Pityocona bifurcatus is a moth in the family Gelechiidae. It was described by Wadhawan and Walia in 2006. It is found in India.

References

Pityocona
Moths described in 2006